John Fraser ( 1823 – June 4, 1878) was an American soldier and educator. He was the third president of the Pennsylvania State University, serving from 1866 until 1868, and the second Chancellor of the University of Kansas serving from 1867 to 1874.

Fraser was born in Cromarty, Scotland, and studied at Aberdeen University. He graduated with a master's degree in mathematics. He emigrated to Bermuda to teach and then relocated to New York City to take charge of a private school. In 1851, he moved to western Pennsylvania and became professor of mathematics at Jefferson College.

During the American Civil War, he enlisted in the 140th Pennsylvania Infantry in 1862 and rose through the ranks to be the regiment's colonel. He fought at the Battle of Gettysburg in the Wheatfield area, taking charge of the 140th when all the senior officers were incapacitated. He was taken as a prisoner of war during the Siege of Petersburg and incarcerated in Charleston, South Carolina.

In recognition of his service, on January 13, 1866, President Andrew Johnson nominated Fraser for appointment to the grade of brevet brigadier general of volunteers, to rank from March 13, 1865, and the United States Senate confirmed the appointment on March 12, 1866.

See also

List of American Civil War brevet generals (Union)

Notes

References
John Fraser 1866-1868

1823 births
1878 deaths
Union Army generals
Presidents of Pennsylvania State University
People of Pennsylvania in the American Civil War
Washington & Jefferson College faculty
American Civil War prisoners of war
Alumni of the University of Aberdeen
Scottish emigrants to the United States
Chancellors of the University of Kansas